Strada statale 125 Orientale Sarda (SS 125) is a national highway in Italy. It is the fastest and oldest connecting road in eastern Sardinia.

References 

125
Transport in Sardinia